Epacris purpurascens var. purpurascens is rare Australian plant from the heath family. Commonly known as the Port Jackson heath, this small plant grows in swamps and scrubby country on sandstone based soils around the Gosford and Sydney region of central eastern New South Wales. See also Epacris purpurascens var. onosmiflora.

References

purpurascens var. purpurascens
Ericales of Australia
Flora of New South Wales